Inner Kitsissut (old spelling Indre Kitsigsut) is an island group in the Kujalleq municipality in southern Greenland.

Geography
Inner Kitsissut is located at the mouth of Coppermine Bay on the southern side, at a minimum distance of 2 km from the shore. It is a compact cluster of small islets and rocks, with a length of 9 km and a width of 6 km. Tulugartalik, the largest islet of the group, has a maximum length of 1.1 km and a height of 58 m.

See also
List of islands of Greenland

References

Uninhabited islands of Greenland
Kujalleq